Campbell Field, officially Marv Kay Stadium at Harry D. Campbell Field, is an American college football stadium located in Golden, Colorado. The stadium serves as the home field of the Colorado Mines Orediggers football team representing the Colorado School of Mines. Campbell Field is one of the oldest football fields in existence, the oldest west of the Mississippi River and the oldest in NCAA Division II.  Originally it was a dirt surface all-purpose athletic field in exactly its current configuration, built within a clay pit, a fitting mined-out home for the Orediggers.  Its first athletic contest, held on May 20, 1893, was the first annual Colorado Inter-Collegiate Athletic Association Field Day, featuring many athletic contests between the University of Colorado, Colorado A&M, Colorado School of Mines, and the University of Denver, in which Mines claimed the most medals.  Its first football game took place on October 7, 1893, a 6-0 Mines victory over the University of Denver.  It has been home to the football Orediggers through all but the first five seasons of their existence (their previous home were the now-destroyed grounds at the southeast corner of 19th and Illinois streets in Golden), and has been renovated several times throughout its existence.  The field was originally called Athletic Park, renamed Brooks Field after Mines trustee and benefactor Ralph D. Brooks in 1922, and renamed Campbell Field after 1939 undefeated team member and benefactor Harry D. Campbell in 2010.  Campbell Field is the oldest football field in the west, the oldest in NCAA Division II football and the 5th oldest college football field in the nation.

Renovations
Historic photographs show Brooks Field as a dirt surface, without grandstands and surrounded by a board fence.  Despite such conditions it is known to have hosted crowds of spectators, who could have used nearby slopes to view games from.  Later early wooden grandstands were added to the park.  In 1922 and 1924 the current grandstands were built by noted local builder William "Cement Bill" Williams.  This featured wooden bench seats upon a steel superstructure, with home and visiting locker rooms, public restrooms and refreshment stand beneath.  In 1922 the dirt surface was converted to natural grass, part of which was scraped back to dirt surface for a baseball diamond during season each year.  Originally home also to the CSM baseball team, it became a primarily football facility in 1937 after baseball was moved to Darden Field just to the west.  During the 1930s a Federal Emergency Relief Administration project scooped out the slopes at the west side of Brooks Field to make room to construct a track around the surface, and it has hosted track and field events since.  Around the 1980s the grandstands were renovated to cover most wooden benches with metal surfaces and create a central concourse, along with steps down to the field level.  In 2010, the field was converted to its third surface, synthetic turf.  Plans are underway to replace the 90-year-old grandstands and update the historic field to a state-of-the-art Division II athletic facility, expanding its capacity to 5,000, to be rechristened Marv Kay Stadium at Campbell Field.

Notable Events
Campbell Field has hosted many notable athletes and teams over its many years of play.  Although missing out on the legendary 103-0 victory of the Orediggers over the University of Colorado in 1890 as well as their first Colorado Football Association championship in 1891, it has hosted 14 championship football teams and more:

 Campbell Field hosted the latter part of the Orediggers' 18-game football winning streak against collegiate teams that spanned from 1888–1894.
 The 3rd perfect and 4th unbeaten season of the football Orediggers took place here in its inaugural season in 1893 (5-0-0, CFA Champions).
 Campbell Field hosted the latter half of the football Orediggers' streak of 6 winning seasons from 1888–1894.
 CSM's earliest known football loss at Campbell Field took place in 1894 to the University of Colorado (a 20-0 shutout).
 The first live televised football game in the Rocky Mountain region took place here on November 1, 1952, a game between the Orediggers and Idaho State University.
 The first live nationally televised football game in the Rocky Mountain region took place here on November 15, 1952, a game between the Orediggers and Colorado College.
 The first football playoff game at Campbell Field took place on November 13, 2004 as the Orediggers beat Midwestern State University.

Notable people
 Baltimore Colts (held training camp here in 1970)
 Leroy Taylor Brown, Olympic silver medalist, men's high jump, Paris 1924 (trained here as Mines graduate student prior to Olympics)
 Dutch Clark, Pro football hall of fame (football coach at Mines in 1933)
 Dallas Cowboys (held training camp here in the 1970s)
 Denver Broncos (held training camp here from 1960–1963)
 Chad Friehauf, 2004 Harlon Hill Trophy winner (Mines quarterback)
 Roy Hartzell, Major League Baseball utility player, St. Louis Browns, New York Highlanders/Yankees (played semipro ball for Golden Reds here)
 Albert E. Jones, Major League Baseball pitcher, Cleveland Spiders, St. Louis Perfectos/Cardinals (played semipro ball for Golden Reds here)
 Jack Liddle, Olympic runner, Berlin 1936 (trained here as Mines student prior to Olympics)
 Lloyd Madden, National Football League player, Chicago Cardinals (played here as Mines student)
 Mark Melancon, Major League Baseball pitcher, New York Yankees, Houston Astros, Boston Red Sox (played here as Golden High School football player)
 Elwood Romney, Brigham Young University hall of fame basketball player and All-American, cousin of Mitt Romney (coached freshman football 1936–1939)

Championship Football Teams
The Orediggers have fielded 16 football champion teams within over a century of play:

1891 – Colorado Football Association Champions^
1892 – Colorado Football Association Champions^
1893 – Colorado Football Association Champions
1897 – State Inter-Collegiate League Champions
1898 – Colorado Football Association Champions
1904 – Colorado Football Association Champions
1906 – Colorado Football Association Champions
1907 – Colorado Football Association Champions
1912 – Rocky Mountain Athletic Conference Champions
1914 – Rocky Mountain Athletic Conference Champions
1918 – Rocky Mountain Athletic Conference Champions
1939 – Rocky Mountain Athletic Conference Champions
1942 – Rocky Mountain Athletic Conference Champions
1951 – Rocky Mountain Athletic Conference Champions
1958 – Rocky Mountain Athletic Conference Co-Champions
2004 – Rocky Mountain Athletic Conference Champions
2010 – Rocky Mountain Athletic Conference Co-Champions

^Orediggers played at original grounds south of the Mines campus in these seasons

References

College football venues
American football venues in Colorado
Baseball venues in Colorado
Colorado School of Mines
Buildings and structures in Golden, Colorado
1893 establishments in Colorado
Sports venues completed in 1893
Soccer venues in Colorado
Defunct college baseball venues in the United States